This is a list of past and present Red Warszawa band members.

Red Warszawa